Eucalyptus flocktoniae, commonly known as merrit, is a species of tree or mallee that is endemic to Western Australia. It has smooth, silvery grey bark, lance-shaped to curved adult leaves, prominently beaked flower buds in groups of seven or nine and barrel-shaped or urn-shaped fruit.

Description
It has smooth silvery grey or brownish bark, sometimes with a small amount of rough bark near the base. Flowering occurs from August to December or from January to April and the flowers are white to cream-coloured or pale yellow.

Taxonomy and naming
Merrit was first formally described in 1911 by Joseph Maiden who gave it the name Eucalyptus oleosa var. flocktoniae in the Journal of the Natural History and Science Society of Western Australia. In 1916, Maiden raised the variety to species status as E. flocktoniae. The specific epithet (flocktoniae) honours "Miss Margaret Flockton, the accomplished artist of my 'Critical Revision of the genus Eucalyptus' and 'Forest Flora of New South Wales'".

"Merrit" is the name given to the species by Noongar people.

In 1999, Dean Nicolle and John Conran described two subspecies and the names have been accepted by the Australian Plant Census:
 Eucalyptus flocktoniae (Maiden) Maiden subsp. flocktoniae has glossy green leaves;
 Eucalyptus flocktoniae subsp. hebes D.Nicolle has bluish green leaves.

Distribution and habitat
Eucalyptus flocktoniae usually grows in open woodland and forest on sandy plains. Subspecies flocktoniae occurs between Mingenew, the Stirling Range and the Ravensthorpe area. Subspecies hebes has a narrower distribution mainly between Esperance and Balladonia.

Gallery

References

flocktoniae
Eucalypts of Western Australia
Myrtales of Australia
Plants described in 1911
Taxa named by Joseph Maiden